Green Forest is a city in Carroll County, Arkansas, United States. The population was 2,972 at the 2020 census.

Geography
Green Forest is located at  (36.334924, -93.432655).  According to the United States Census Bureau, the city has a total area of 5.9 km (2.3 mi²), all land.

Demographics

2020 census

As of the 2020 United States census, there were 2,972 people, 928 households, and 651 families residing in the city.

2010 census
At the 2010 census there were 3,271 people, 1072 households, and 977 families living in the city.  The population density was 458.1/km (1,187.4/mi²).  There were 1,146 housing units at an average density of 176.4/km (457.1/mi²).  The racial makeup of the city was 64.3% White, 0.40% Black or African American, 1.07% Native American, 0.48% Asian, 0.37% Pacific Islander, 12.37% from other races, and 2.76% from two or more races.  33.20% of the population were Hispanic or Latino of any race.
Of the 1072 households 37.4% had children under the age of 18 living with them, 51.9% were married couples living together, 13.1% had a female householder with no husband present, and 30.2% were non-families. 23.2% of households were one person and 11.2% were one person aged 65 or older.  The average household size was 2.82 and the average family size was 3.27.

The age distribution was 28.6% under the age of 18, 12.7% from 18 to 24, 30.8% from 25 to 44, 15.8% from 45 to 64, and 12.1% 65 or older.  The median age was 30 years. For every 100 females, there were 96.9 males.  For every 100 females age 18 and over, there were 96.0 males.

The median household income was $23,750 and the median family income  was $26,765. Males had a median income of $18,886 versus $16,686 for females. The per capita income for the city was $10,720.  About 16.7% of families and 22.1% of the population were below the poverty line, including 23.7% of those under age 18 and 23.5% of those age 65 or over.

Education

Public education 
Elementary and secondary school students may attend Green Forest School District which includes all three of the Green Forest Elementary School, Green Forest Intermediate School, and Green Forest Middle School, consecutively, which leads to graduation from Green Forest High School.

Public libraries 
The Green Forest Public Library is a branch library of the Carroll And Madison Library System. The library opened in 1935.

Transportation
 U.S. Highway 62
 Arkansas Highway 103
 Arkansas Highway 311

Notable people
Helen Gurley Brown was born in Green Forest.
David Crockett Graham was born in Green Forest.
Bart Hester was born in Green Forest.

References

Cities in Carroll County, Arkansas
Cities in Arkansas